House of Dust is a 2014 supernatural thriller film directed by A.D. Calvo. The movie had its world premiere on May 20, 2014 and focuses on a group of college students that become possessed by the ghosts of former mental patients. Filming took place in Willimantic, Connecticut and Mansfield, Connecticut at the Mansfield Training School and Hospital, University of Connecticut, and Eastern Connecticut State University during the summer of 2011.

Plot

1951 - Having already killed OCD patient Billy Brown (Michael Goodin) at the Redding House Asylum, a psychiatrist (Stephen Spinella) experiments on simple-minded inmate Melvin Veman (Peyton Clarkson) and sociopath Levius Laitura (John Lee Ames). With Levius still alive, the psychiatrist has his orderlies put the bodies of all three men inside the crematorium to burn them.

Present Day - Camden College student Dylan (Eddie Hassell) tells his girlfriend Gabby (Holland Roden) and his roommate Kolt (Steven Grayhm) about the now abandoned asylum's haunted history. New student Emma (Inbar Lavi) moves in as Gabby's roommate and Kolt takes a liking to her. However, fellow students Allyson (Alesandra Assante), Christine (Nicole Travolta) and Blythe (Joy Lauren) do not.

Dylan, Kolt, Gabby and Emma break into Redding House after a party to look around despite a warning from campus security guard Clyde (Justin James Lang). Emma has strange experiences while exploring on her own. The other three knock over a container of cremated ashes and inhale the dust of the three men burned there in 1951.

A recovering psychiatric patient herself, Emma begins experiencing haunting visions upon returning to the dorm. The behavior of the other three students gradually changes as Billy possesses Dylan, Melvin inhabits Gabby and Levius takes control of Kolt's body.

Allyson is killed by someone unseen while doing laundry. Christine is later killed while taking her dog outside. Suspecting that the disappearances and the odd behaviors are related to the asylum, Emma tries to go back to Redding House, but Clyde prevents her from going inside.

With Levius in full control of his actions, Kolt attacks Emma. Emma eventually flees into the asylum and confirms her suspicions when she examines patient records and finds the empty urn knocked over by the others. Emma then finds the dead bodies of Allyson, Christine and Blythe (who was killed off screen).

Kolt captures Emma, but Dylan knocks him unconscious (he also knocks Emma unconscious as well) and traps Kolt in the crematorium with Gabby. Emma recovers and frees Kolt and Gabby from the fire, which releases everyone from their possessions. Dylan coughs up Billy's spirit as well. The four students escape Redding House with Clyde's assistance. The crematorium dust goes through the chimney and into the air, ultimately possessing a little boy (Anthony Scarpone-Lambert) playing in the park with the other children nearby.

Cast
Inbar Lavi as Emma
Steven Grayhm as Kolt
Eddie Hassell as Dylan
Holland Roden as Gabby
John Lee Ames as Levius Laitura 
Peyton Clarkson as Melvin Veman
Michael Goodin as Billy Brown
Stephen Spinella as Psychiatrist 
Justin James Lang as Clyde
Alesandra Assante as Allyson
Joy Lauren as Blythe
Nicole Travolta as Christine
Anthony Scarpone-Lambert as Boy

Reception
HorrorNews.net panned House of Dust, praising the movie's cast while stating that the movie "didn’t bring anything new to the table and was just lackluster and forgettable overall". DVD Verdict gave a mixed review and commented that while the movie was "no classic", that "A.D. Calvo directs the action well and gets good performances from actors lacking much experience" and that it would appeal best to fans of independent horror or films set in mental institutions.

References

External links
 
 

2013 films
2013 psychological thriller films
Films set in Connecticut
American independent films
American ghost films
American supernatural horror films
Films about psychiatry
Films set in abandoned houses
Films set in psychiatric hospitals
Films directed by A. D. Calvo
2010s English-language films
2010s American films